Ultra HD Blu-ray (4K Ultra HD, UHD-BD, or 4K Blu-ray) is a digital optical disc data storage format that is an enhanced variant of Blu-ray. Ultra HD Blu-ray discs are incompatible with existing standard Blu-ray players, though a traditional Blu-ray and digital copy are often packaged with Ultra HD Blu-ray discs. Ultra HD Blu-ray supports 4K UHD (3840 × 2160 pixel resolution) video at frame rates up to 60 progressive frames per second, encoded using High-Efficiency Video Coding. The discs support both high dynamic range by increasing the color depth to 10-bit per color and a greater color gamut than supported by conventional Blu-ray video by using the Rec. 2020 color space. The format is supported on Microsoft's Xbox One X, One S, Series X, and Sony's PlayStation 5. Video games made for the Xbox Series X and the PlayStation 5 can use 100 GB UHD Blu-ray discs.

To differentiate retail Ultra HD Blu-ray releases, the format usually uses a black opaque or slightly transparent keep case packaging format (as opposed to blue). The case size is the same as that of a normal Blu-ray disc.

Specifications
The specification allows for three disc capacities, each with its own data rate: 50 GB at 72 or 92 Mbit/s, and 66 GB and 100 GB at 92, 123, or 144 Mbit/s. On 66 GB and 100 GB discs, the pits and lands are not narrower than those of a standard Blu-ray Disc, but shorter, which increases the capacity of each layer from 25 GB to 33 1/3 GB. This also means that each revolution of such a disc transfers more data than that of a standard Blu-ray Disc, which means the transfer rate is higher with the same linear velocity. In addition, the disc can be encoded to have the drive spin back up to the full 5,000 rpm starting from a point slightly away from the innermost part of the disc if an even higher transfer rate is needed. 50 and 66 GB use two layers, and 100 GB uses three layers. Ultra HD Blu-ray technology was licensed in mid-2015, and players had an expected release date of Christmas 2015. Ultra HD Blu-ray uses a new revision of AACS DRM: AACS 2. In addition, AACS 2.1 is used on certain releases (Stand by Me, Fury, The Patriot, Zombieland).

On May 12, 2015, the Blu-ray Disc Association revealed completed specifications and the official Ultra HD Blu-ray logo. Unlike conventional DVDs and Blu-rays, the new 4K format does not have region coding.

On February 14, 2016, the BDA released Ultra HD Blu-ray with mandatory support for HDR10 Media Profile video and optional support for Dolby Vision.

On January 23, 2018, the BDA spec v3.2 gained optional support for HDR10+ and Philips and Technicolor's SL-HDR2, also known as Advanced HDR by Technicolor. However, no Ultra HD Blu-ray player has ever supported SL-HDR2, and no discs encoded in SL-HDR2 have been released.

Most retail Ultra HD Blu-ray discs are encoded with Ateme TITAN. Ultra HD Blu-ray discs use HDMV or BD-J for menus. Subtitles use Presentation Graphics Stream, which is the same format as normal Blu-ray discs.

Only computers with activated Software Guard Extensions (SGX) support Ultra HD Blu-ray playback. Intel introduced SGX in the Skylake generation Core processors in 2016, enabling PCs to play protected Blu-ray discs for the first time. In January 2022, Intel deprecated support for SGX for the Rocket Lake and Alder Lake generation desktop processors, leading to Ultra HD Blu-ray discs being unplayable on those systems.

Initial releases

The first Ultra HD Blu-ray Discs were officially released in the United States on February 14, 2016:
 Sony Pictures Home Entertainment made six releases: The Amazing Spider-Man 2, Salt, Hancock, Chappie, Pineapple Express, and The Smurfs 2.
 Lionsgate Home Entertainment made four releases: Sicario, The Last Witch Hunter, The Expendables 3, and Ender's Game.
 Warner Bros. Home Entertainment released four titles, Mad Max: Fury Road, The Lego Movie, Pan, and San Andreas.
 20th Century Fox Home Entertainment made seven releases: The Martian, Kingsman: The Secret Service, Exodus: Gods and Kings, Maze Runner: The Scorch Trials, Wild, Hitman: Agent 47, and the 2015 Fantastic Four reboot.
 Paramount Home Entertainment made two releases: Star Trek (2009) and its sequel Into Darkness on June 14, 2016.
 Universal Pictures Home Entertainment made three releases: Lucy, Oblivion, and Lone Survivor on August 9, 2016.
 Walt Disney Studios Home Entertainment made its first release: Guardians of the Galaxy Vol. 2 on August 22, 2017.
 Magnolia Home Entertainment made its first release: Marrowbone on August 7, 2018.
 Kino Lorber made its first release: Hannibal on May 7, 2019.
 Synapse Films made its first release: Suspiria on November 19, 2019.
 Vinegar Syndrome made its first release: Tammy and the T-Rex on November 29, 2019.
 Shout! Factory made its first release: The Deer Hunter on May 26, 2020. 
It also released many IMAX documentaries from 2016 to 2020.
 Blue Underground made its first two releases: Maniac and Zombie on May 26, 2020.
 Arrow Video made its first release: Flash Gordon on August 18, 2020.
 Severin Films made its first two releases: The Day of the Beast and Perdita Durango on March 30, 2021.
 The Criterion Collection made its first UHD release: Mulholland Drive, on November 16, 2021. Three other films, Citizen Kane, Menace II Society, and Uncut Gems, were released the following week.

These were released by non-American companies.

Warner Music Group on May 22, 2017, released Sammi Cheng's Touch Mi 2 World Tour, which is officially the world's first live concert released in UHD Blu-ray format in Hong Kong. This is the first live show production recorded in 4K format, and the field production and pre-production work began in November 2016.
 StudioCanal UK made its first release: Terminator 2: Judgment Day on December 4, 2017.
 Second Sight Films made its first release: Dawn of the Dead on November 16, 2020.
 BFI Video made its first release: The Seventh Seal on October 18, 2021.
 88 Films made its first release: Drive on August 29, 2022.
 Eureka Entertainment made its first release: Police Story Trilogy on September 26, 2022.

References

 
2016 in technology
Audiovisual introductions in 2016
Consumer electronics
High dynamic range
High-definition television
Home video
Products introduced in 2016
Rotating disc computer storage media
Television terminology
Ultra-high-definition television
Video storage
PlayStation 5
Xbox One software